Broad Street Church of Christ, originally Central Emmanuel Baptist Church, is a historic church in Cookeville, Tennessee.

The church was originally Baptist. It is now used by the United Methodist Church and has been renamed Wesley Chapel. It was built in about 1920 in a Romanesque design and has a corner tower.

It was added to the National Register of Historic Places in 2002.

References

Baptist churches in Tennessee
United Methodist churches in Tennessee
Churches on the National Register of Historic Places in Tennessee
Buildings and structures in Putnam County, Tennessee
National Register of Historic Places in Putnam County, Tennessee